Niederndorferberg is a municipality in the Kufstein district in the Austrian state of Tyrol located 8 km north of Kufstein and 3.4 km north above Ebbs near the border to Bavaria, Germany. It has six parts and was once connected with Niederndorf before it became an own community. The main source of income is the production of milk & cheese.

References

External links
 Official website

Cities and towns in Kufstein District